Mohammadabad (also Romanized as Moḩammadābād) is a village in Qaleh Biyaban Rural District, in the Central District of Darab County, Fars Province, Iran. At the 2006 census, its population was 82, in 17 families.

References 

Populated places in Darab County